Bernard Joseph Michael Maher (born 11 February 1961) was an English professional cricketer and is a fly-fishing international.

Maher was born in Hillingdon in West London, and is of Irish extraction.

As a cricketer, he was a right-handed batsman and a wicket-keeper who played first-class cricket for Derbyshire from 1981 and 1995.

Maher played Under 16 and 18 age-group cricket for Middlesex County Cricket Club. His senior cricketing debut came in 1977, when he played for the first time for Middlesex's Second XI. against Yorkshire at Hornsey. and a further game versus the Combined Services, before pursuing his academic studies.

He began reading Economics and Accountancy at Loughborough University in 1978 graduating with a BSc in 1981. Captaining Loughborough University, against Derbyshire in 1981, Maher's talent was spotted by Philip Russell, the then Derbyshire coach, and was asked to play a series of 2nd team games. Maher's debut was against Gloucestershire County Cricket Club in 1981, taking 5 catches and a stumping on debut,  and Derbyshire signed him on a two-year contract.

His batting skills matured at the County Ground, and Derbyshire's new pace attack, headed West Indies paceman Michael Holding and Devon Malcolm, Maher was promoted to the role of opening batsman. Maher was described in 'The Cricketer Magazine', as a very courageous batsman, used a foil against opposition bowling attacks, on Derbyshire's green, bowler friendly wickets'. Against the New Zealand's tourists in 1986, Maher scored 126, and there were other hundreds against Leicestershire County Cricket Club, Surrey County Cricket Club, and Cambridge University.

After a number of years in the role of Wicketkeeper Opening /Batsman in 1990 Maher was replaced as a regular by Karl Krikken. Maher took on the role of Derbyshire second team coach in 1990, but he was on call for the first team, and played a large part of the 1993 season for the first team due to injuries, his final game being against Lancashire County Cricket Club in 1993. Maher stayed as player-coach until 1995 when a lower back injury forced his retirement.

Gerald Mortimer a ' Derbyshire Evening Telegraph' journalist, in an article in 1995, described Maher, 'as a man who you would want on your side, as he would never let you down'. After his retirement from cricket, Maher continued commentating for BBC Radio and, after his cricketing days came to a close, worked as a Financial Consultant, and a Fly-Fishing instructor.

Maher is a current England fly-fishing international, and was national English fly-fishing champion in 2005/6. He also has 5 Commonwealth team medals, in championships in Devon, England 2014, Tasmania 2012, Rhayader Wales 2010, Islay Scotland 2009, and New Zealand 2008.

He is the owner of 'Press Manor Fishing Lakes' in Ashover, near Chesterfield, Derbyshire, where he operates a day-ticket fishing business. He holds coaching and instructor qualifications for the Association of Advanced Professional Game Angling Instructors (AAPGAI), the American Federation of Fly Fishers (FFF) and Advanced Professional Game Angling Qualifications (APGAI) in Trout and Salmon.

References

1958 births
English cricketers
Derbyshire cricketers
Living people
Wicket-keepers